Kazimierz Pac (died 1696) was a Polish nobleman and bishop of Smoleńsk since 1664 and Samogitia since 3 October 1667, canon of Wilno since 1657.

Son of Piotr Pac and brother of Hetman Michał Kazimierz Pac.

Bibliography 
Pacowie: materyjały historyczno-genealogiczne / ułożone i wydane przez Józefa Wolffa, 1885, pp. 137-141
Jan Władysław Poczobut Odlanicki, Pamiętnik, Warszawa 1987
A. Rachuba, Kazimierz Pac. In: Polski Słownik Biograficzny, Vol. XXIV, 1979, pp. 706-707.

External links 
Biskup Kazimierz Pac

1696 deaths
Pac family
Polish nobility
Bishops of Smolensk
Ecclesiastical senators of the Polish–Lithuanian Commonwealth
Year of birth unknown
17th-century Roman Catholic bishops in the Polish–Lithuanian Commonwealth